The ISO Recorder Power Toy is CD burning software for Windows XP, Windows Server 2003, Windows Vista and Windows 7. It is written by Alex Feinman and is open source software released under a license similar to the BSD license with advertising clause.  This (along with some other third party software) was mentioned by an online article, named "Windows XP CD Burning Secrets", on Microsoft's website. The software is used to burn an ISO 9660 image file to CD or DVD and can create an ISO image from folders.

The software:
 adds an Explorer menu item called "Create ISO image file" when you right-click on a folder;
 adds an Explorer menu item called "Copy image to CD" when you right-click on an ISO;
 associates itself with the .ISO extension.

On Windows XP, the software cannot create or burn anything larger than a CD. As of version 3.1, ISO Recorder is compatible with Windows 7.

References

External links 
 ISO Recorder (project home page)

Free optical disc authoring software
Windows-only free software
Windows CD/DVD writing software